Shanaka Sampath (born 17 June 1991) is a Sri Lankan cricketer. He made his Twenty20 debut for Kalutara Town Club in the 2017–18 SLC Twenty20 Tournament on 27 February 2018. He made his List A debut for Kalutara Town Club in the 2017–18 Premier Limited Overs Tournament on 18 March 2018.

References

External links
 

1991 births
Living people
Sri Lankan cricketers
Kalutara Town Club cricketers
Place of birth missing (living people)